Acleris trujilloana is a species of moth of the family Tortricidae. It is found in Venezuela.

The wingspan is about 19 mm. The ground colour of the forewings is yellow orange strigulated (finely streaked) with brown and preserved at the costa postmedially and at the postbasal part of the dorsum. The remaining area is brown orange, strongly suffused with dark brown, except for the postmedian and apical areas which are brownish orange. The hindwings are white cream, in the distal part suffused and strigulated with grey.

Etymology
The species name refers to the state of Trujillo in Venezuela.

References

Moths described in 2013
trujilloana
Moths of South America